The women's 58 kilograms event at the 2002 Asian Games took place on October 2, 2002 at Pukyong National University Gymnasium.

Schedule
All times are Korea Standard Time (UTC+09:00)

Records

Results

References
2002 Asian Games Official Report, Page 760
 Weightlifting Database
 Women's results

Weightlifting at the 2002 Asian Games